Charles Snead Houston (August 24, 1913 – September 27, 2009) was an American physician, mountaineer, high-altitude investigator, inventor, author, film-maker, and former Peace Corps administrator. He made two important and celebrated attempts to climb the mountain K2 in the Karakoram Range.

Early life and education
Houston was born in New York in 1913 and grew up in Great Neck on Long Island. He was educated at The Hotchkiss School and Harvard University, and he earned a Doctor of Medicine from Columbia University College of Physicians and Surgeons.

Mountaineering
Houston began climbing in the Alps with his father where they met Scottish mountaineer  T. Graham Brown.  He then gained experience on several expeditions to Canada and America making the second ascent of Mount Foraker in 1934, with T. Graham Brown and Chychele Waterston.  In 1936, Houston was a member of the British–American Himalayan Expedition led by the British climber H.W. Tilman to the top of Nanda Devi in India, the highest mountain climbed at that time. In 1938, he was the leader of the first American Karakoram expedition to K2. Although he did not reach the summit, his party mapped a route to the top that was later used by the Italian team that first summited the mountain in 1954. In 1950 Houston and Tilman led a trekking expedition to the Khumbu Glacier, just west of Mount Everest. They were the first Westerners to get there (and amongst the first mountaineers to be allowed into Nepal). They examined the Khumbu Icefall to see whether it provided a means of climbing Everest and were the first observers of the higher parts of Everest from Khumbu - the route subsequently taken by Sir Edmund Hillary in Everest's first successful ascent. 

He attempted K2 again in 1953 (see Third American Karakoram Expedition). A member of the team, Art Gilkey, became ill (probably with thrombophlebitis) as they approached the summit. The team reversed direction and tried to carry Gilkey down. However, he was lost in a disastrous cascade of events precipitated by a fall where upon multiple ropes became entangled, resulting in most of the team sliding out of control roped together down the mountain.  When the last roped man, Pete Schoening, was about to be plucked off by the accelerating climbers, he was remarkably able to arrest the fall of all six climbers using an ice axe belay.  "The Belay" was one of the most famous events in mountaineering history.

After the 1953 K2 expedition, Houston (then age 40) never participated on any further technical climbs.

Medical practice and teaching
Houston practiced internal medicine in Exeter, New Hampshire and Aspen, Colorado. Later, he joined the faculty at the University of Vermont as Professor of Medicine. He retired from the faculty in 1979.

Medical research
Houston began his study of the effects of high altitude as a naval flight surgeon in World War II. He was in charge of Operation Everest (1947) in which four subjects were taken to a simulated altitude of 8850 m over 34 days in a compression chamber.  These studies demonstrated that careful acclimatization would allow pilots to fly unpressurized planes to altitudes of 15,000 feet and higher. This capacity afforded the US Army Air Force an important tactical advantage.

He was among the first to study High Altitude Pulmonary Edema (1958), and High Altitude Retinal Hemorrhage (1968). He authored numerous books and articles about mountain medicine. Starting in 1975, he organized the International Hypoxia Symposia in the Canadian Rockies.

In 1996 he was awarded the King Albert Medal of Merit to honor his "singular achievements" in the mountain world .

Houston was also involved with early attempts to construct an artificial heart. Although not successful, his design was influential in later developments, including the Jarvik-7 model that was used with some success.

Peace Corps service
From 1962 to 1965, Houston served as the first Country Director of the Peace Corps for India. During his tenure, the volunteers in India grew from 6 to 250. He was instrumental in developing a doctors' division within the Corps.

Works by Charles S. Houston

References

External links
Charles Houston Papers MSS 716. Special Collections & Archives, UC San Diego Library.
 Dr Charles Houston - Daily Telegraph obituary
 Doctor Charles Houston Independent obituary, 1 October 2009.

Notes

References

American mountain climbers
Physicians from Vermont
Hotchkiss School alumni
Harvard University alumni
Columbia University Vagelos College of Physicians and Surgeons alumni
1913 births
2009 deaths
Peace Corps volunteers